Maestro, meaning "master" or "teacher" in Italian, is a term of respect used particularly in the international music world.

Maestro may also refer to:

Film and TV
 Maestro (2005 film), a Hungarian animated film
 Maestro (2014 film), a French film
 Maestro! (2015 film), a Japanese film
 Maestro (2021 film), an Indian film
 Maestro (2023 film), an American biographical film about Leonard Bernstein
 The Maestro (2018 film), a 2018 American film
 Maestros (film) 2000 Spanish comedy film
 The Maestro: A Symphony of Terror, a Thai horror/art house film by Paul Spurrier and S. P. Somtow
 Maestro (British TV series), a 2008 BBC reality TV show
 "The Maestro" (Seinfeld), a 1995 episode of the TV show Seinfeld

Brand names
 Maestro PMS, a software product from Northwind Canada Inc.
 Maestro (airline), a Canadian charter airline
 Austin Maestro, a car built by Austin-Rover
 Maestro (debit card), a debit card operated by MasterCard
 Maestro (TV channel), a Georgian TV channel
 Maestro (video game), a MusicVR game by Mike Oldfield
 Maestro (software), a software application used by NASA and Jet Propulsion Laboratory
 Maestro I (software-hardware combination) the world's first Integrated development environment for software
 Maestro Talent and Management, a defunct Malaysian company owned by Astro
 Gibson Maestro, the most popular of several Gibson Vibrola vibrato mechanisms for guitar
 Maestro, a brand of gastric electrical stimulator

Books
 Maestra (novel), a 2016 novel by British author Lisa Hilton, under the penname L.S.Hilton
 Maestro (character), a version of the Hulk from an alternate future
 Maestro (manga), a manga series by Akira Sasō
 Maestro (novel), a novel by Peter Goldsworthy
 The Maestro, a novel by Tim Wynne-Jones

People with the nickname 
 Alan Greenspan, former U.S. Federal Reserve chairman, who was formerly considered masterful at that post
 Andrea Pirlo, Italian footballer
 Ma Jae-yoon, StarCraft player
 Roger Federer, Swiss tennis player
 Stephen Hendry, snooker player
 The Maestro (wrestler), a professional wrestler named Robert Kellum in real life
 Maestro (footballer) (António Simão Muanza), Angolan footballer

Music
 Maestro (producer), producer of contemporary pop and hip-hop music
 Maestro Fresh Wes, Canadian rapper
 Maestro Harrell, American rapper
 Travis "Maestro" Meeks, singer and guitarist for the band Days of the New
 "Maestro", makers of the effect unit the Echoplex
 "Maestro", a quarterly magazine about Ennio Morricone

Albums
 The Maestro (Horace Parlan album), a 1979 album by Horace Parlan
 The Maestro (Cedar Walton album), a 1981 album by Cedar Walton featuring Abbey Lincoln
 Maestro (Kaizers Orchestra album) (2005), and the title song
 Maestro (Taj Mahal album)
 Maestro (Moacir Santos album)
 Maestro (EP), 2005 EP by Kaizers Orchestra
 Maestros (album) by Orquesta El Arranque

Songs
 "Maestro", a song by Sarah Close from the EP Caught Up
 "The Maestro", a song by Beastie Boys from the album Check Your Head
 "The Maestro", from Caro Emerald's 2013 album The Shocking Miss Emerald

Other
 Maestro (wind), a type of Mediterranean wind
 Maestro, a character in the Zatch Bell! anime series